Aqajeri, also rendered as Aqa Jari may refer to:
 Aqajeri, East Azerbaijan
 Aqa Jari, East Azerbaijan
 Aghajari, Khuzestan Province
 Aqa Jeri, Kurdistan Province
 Aqa Jari, Zanjan
Aqchari, Qazvin